The 1985 UK & Ireland Greyhound Racing Year was the 59th year of greyhound racing in the United Kingdom and Ireland.

Roll of honour

Summary
The closure of White City in 1984 had hit the industry hard but two greyhounds by the names of Ballyregan Bob and Scurlogue Champ began to popularize the sport once again. Ballyregan Bob won 21 consecutive races by the end of the year including the Olympic final, Test and Essex Vase final. Trainer George Curtis then chose wisely as to which events to go for in order to preserve the chance of breaking the world record which stood at 31. He was voted Greyhound of the Year.

Scurlogue Champ became a crowd favourite with his remarkable running style and became a household name when winning BBC Television Trophy on 22 May at Monmore and setting 13 new track records around the country. 

The National Greyhound Racing Club (NGRC) released the annual returns, with totalisator turnover at £59,110,759 and attendances recorded at 3,786,216 from 4736 meetings. Track tote remained at 17.5% and government tote tax at 4%.

Tracks
Southend closed after Boxing Day and Weymouth was redeveloped which ended the greyhound racing there.  The Crayford & Bexleyheath Stadium raced until 18 May before the stadium was closed for major redevelopment by Ladbrokes. Work started on a new stadium on a different part of the site and would become known as Crayford Stadium. 

Brough Park was sold again when former trainer Kevin Wilde headed a management team that leased the track. Kinsley was taken over by John Curran and Keith Morrell and Poole shut for four months during renovation.

Whitwood in Castleford raced for the first time under NGRC rules after switching from independent status.

News
An Act of Parliament was passed in July allowing tracks to choose their own days of racing. NGRC secretary Fred Underhill had campaigned to change the laws governing race days and frequency of race days. 

On 12 December Ballyregan Bob risked losing his winning run when taking part in the John Power Showdown at Wembley, a race that included Scurlogue Champ. The run at the time stood at 19 wins and he only needed one win to match the 1974 record set by Westpark Mustard. In an anticlimax Scurlogue Champ failed to finish after pulling up lame leaving Ballyregan Bob to equal the record and annihilate the field. A future BBC TV trophy winner Glenowen Queen trailed in 11¾ behind in second place.

Competitions
Smokey Pete trained by Kenny Linzell won both the Scottish Greyhound Derby and Edinburgh Cup, during the latter he defeated kennelmate Ballintubber One by a short head. It is the third time the pair have finished 1-2 in a competition following the same in the Select Stakes and Circuit.

Ireland
The Irish Greyhound Board produced figures showing increases in export sales including exporting to Spain.  Tico, a black dog by The Stranger out of Derry Linda first ran at Clonmel on 8 July for his breeder Jimmy Morrissey of Carrick-on-Suir and won in impressive fashion by ten lengths, recording 29.86 seconds for the 525 yards course. A few weeks later he came into the charge of Slough trainer, Arthur Hitch. Tico cost his new owner, Alan Smee, £5,000 and had a few acclimatising runs at Wimbledon towards the end of the year.

Principal UK races

+Track Record

	

+Track Record dh = dead-heat

Totalisator returns

The totalisator returns declared to the National Greyhound Racing Club for the year 1985 are listed below.

References 

Greyhound racing in the United Kingdom
Greyhound racing in the Republic of Ireland
UK and Ireland Greyhound Racing Year
UK and Ireland Greyhound Racing Year
UK and Ireland Greyhound Racing Year
UK and Ireland Greyhound Racing Year